Antisthenes was the name of several people in the time of Ancient Greece:

Antisthenes of Athens, 445-365 BCE, pupil of Socrates and the founder of the Cynic school of philosophy
Antisthenes (Heraclitean), disciple of Heraclitus
Antisthenes of Agrigentum, an immensely wealthy citizen of Agrigentum
Antisthenes of Rhodes,  200 BCE, Greek historian
Antisthenes of Sparta,  412 BCE, a Spartan admiral in the Peloponnesian war